Pope John XXIII declared 11 individuals venerable, based on the recognition of their heroic virtues from 1958 to 1963.

1959

December 18, 1959
Elizabeth Ann Seton (1774–1821)
Jeremiah of Wallachia (1556–1625)

1960

February 28, 1960
François de Montmorency Laval (1623–1708)

May 28, 1960
Meinrad Eugster (1848–1925)

1961

April 26, 1961
Geltrude Comensoli (1847–1903)
Leonardo Murialdo (1828–1900)

June 25, 1961
Marie-Eugénie de Jésus (1817–1898)

1962

April 6, 1962
Luigi Guanella (1842–1915)

July 7, 1962
Antonia de Oviedo Schöntal (1822–1898)
Luigi Maria Palazzolo (1827–1886)

1963

February 25, 1963
Pauline-Marie Jaricot (1799–1862)

See also
 List of people declared venerable by Pope Paul VI
 List of people declared venerable by Pope John Paul II
 List of people declared venerable by Pope Benedict XVI
 List of people declared venerable by Pope Francis

External links
Patron Saints Index

Venerable by Pope John XXIII